Katuwal, Katawal,Katowal, Katwal is a surname used in Darjeeling, Nepal,Assam, and Kumaon region from Uttarakhand.

They belong to Ekthariya subcaste that is widely accepted to be of patrilineal Rajput and Chhetri  origin from present day India, which is in contrast to Bahuthariya (multiple clan)  Chhetri subcaste which is of patrilineal Khas origin. They were one of subcaste(Clan) of Chettri community like Thapa,Karki,Bisht,Khadka,Basnyat etc.They also wear the sacred thread.They were considered as one of a noble family of Chhetri Clan of Nepalese and Gorkha Kingdom.They belong to Jharra Chhetri (subgroup of chhetri caste)

Notable people
Notable people bearing the name or its variants include:
Jeet Ram Katwal, Indian MLA in Himachal PradeshManoj Katuwal]], Nepali cricket player who played for the Nepal National Cricket Team between 2002 and 2006
General Rookmangud Katawal, former Chief of Army Staff of the Nepali Army
Yubraj Katawal,
 Former President- Free Education Consultancy's Organization Nepal (FECON)
 Hari Bhakta Katuwal, prominent poet and lyricist of Nepal

See also
Naule Katuwal, named after Katuwals
Mahat
Budhathoki
Rayamajhi
Raut
Bohara
Chauhan

Notes

References

Nepali-language surnames
Khas surnames
Surnames of Nepalese origin